is a 1989 Japanese neo-noir action thriller film directed, co-written by and starring Takeshi Kitano. It was Kitano's directorial debut, and marked the beginning of his career as a filmmaker.

Plot
Kitano plays Azuma, a police detective who lives with his intellectually disabled sister Akari (who he is extremely overprotective of), has a gambling problem that forces him to constantly borrow money, and has a reputation for using excessive violence when dealing with criminals, ignoring police rules and regulations when they become inconvenient, and for his strong sense of morality, which is shown when, after witnessing a gang of teenage boys beat up a homeless man for fun, he enters the home of the gang's leader and beats him before making him promise to turn himself and his friends in, which he does the next day. Azuma's superiors, who admire him for his ability to get results, overlook his constant violations of the police code by making him write "apologies" whenever he does something unlawful.

Azuma and his new partner, Kikuchi, are assigned to a case involving a murdered dope pusher, and break up an attempted drug deal in the bathroom of a nightclub. The seller, who works for yakuza boss Nito, names Azuma's close friend Iwaki, a cop on the vice squad, as his supplier. Azuma is subsequently asked to help find Iwaki, who has seemingly gone into hiding due to newspapers uncovering his ties to the yakuza. A fisherman then finds Iwaki's corpse hanging from a noose under a bridge.

Refusing to believe that his friend committed suicide, Azuma attempts to track down the dealers from before, but both men are executed by Kiyohiro, a sociopathic yakuza hitman. Unable to take action against the well-connected Nito, Azuma resorts to planting drugs in Kiyohiro's apartment, then taking him back to the station and having Kikuchi stand guard while he tortures the gangster and threatens him with a gun. This goes too far for the deputy chief, who forces Azuma to resign from the police to protect the force from investigation.

Azuma spends his first day of unemployment visiting an art gallery, hitting baseballs at a batting cage, and people-watching at the park, while Kiyohiro and his men pick up Akari at a shop and bring her to their hideout, where they take turns raping her and getting her hooked on drugs. Kiyohiro also defies Nito's orders and tries to stab Azuma on a busy street; Azuma grabs the knife and Kiyohiro pulls a gun, accidentally killing a young woman when his shot misses. Azuma manages to stab Kiyohiro in the leg and escapes. The next day, he purchases ammo and an unregistered gun from a friend at the gambling parlor and practices shooting it.

Knowing that Azuma will come for him, Kiyohiro goes back to his hideout and orders his men to arm themselves for a shootout; he shoots one dead for refusing his orders and kills another when the man unsuccessfully tries to kill him. The third man flees and Azuma takes him out as he opens the door. A wounded Kiyohiro grabs two guns from his stash and empties them both into Azuma, who calmly fires back. Just as Kiyohiro goes for a third gun, Azuma shoots him in the face. Akari runs out and starts searching his pockets for more drugs. Knowing that she's too far gone, her brother puts his last bullet in her head.

Azuma, badly wounded, starts to walk towards the door, but Shinkai, Nito's former advisor, guns him down in revenge after Azuma executed Nito under the mistaken belief that he had ordered Kiyohiro to go after Akari. Sometime later, Kikuchi, now a senior member of the vice squad, meets with Shinkai, who explains that with the heat surrounding Azuma's actions dying down, he wants Kikuchi to take over for Iwaki and continue to sell drugs through the police force. Kikuchi eagerly accepts Shinkai's offer and leaves.

Cast
Takeshi Kitano as Azuma 
Maiko Kawakami as Akari
Makoto Ashikawa as Kikuchi
Shirō Sano as Yoshinari
Sei Hiraizumi as Iwaki 
Mikiko Otonashi as Iwaki's wife
Hakuryu as Kiyohiro
Ittoku Kishibe as Nito
Ken Yoshizawa as Shinkai
Nobuyuki Katsube as Deputy Police Chief Higuchi
Akira Hamada as Chief Detective Araki
Yuuki Kawai as Detective Honma
Ritsuko Amano as Honma's Fiancée
Tarō Ishida as Detective Tashiro
Kenichi Endō as Emoto
Susumu Terajima as Oda

Title
The Japanese title is the same as that given to the Japanese translation, by Makoto Sawa (佐和誠), of James Hadley Chase's 1968 novel Believed Violent, published by Tokyo Sogen-sha  (東京創元社)  in the Sogen Mystery Library  (Sogen suiri bunko: 創元推理文庫) series in June 1972. The phrase「その男、凶暴につき」appears to suggest the wording of a police wanted poster ("This man, because of his extreme violence [should not be approached]"), but does not usually appear on Japanese wanted posters (shimei tehai: 指名手配), and may have been Sawa's own rendering of the English original.

Production
Although Kinji Fukasaku was the film's original director, he stepped down over a scheduling conflict due to Kitano's TV commitments. The distributor suggested the comedian direct it at his own pace, and Kitano accepted. The screenplay was originally written by Hisashi Nozawa, but upon taking over as director Kitano rewrote the script heavily. Despite his contributions to the screenplay, he was left uncredited as a contributing writer.

The film was originally meant to be a comedy but Kitano wanted to try being a serious actor, therefore he made the movie into a police drama.

Reception
The movie was a moderate financial success in Japan, and also did moderately well in limited release internationally.

Soundtrack
The piano theme heard several times during the movie is Erik Satie's "Gnossienne No.1". The nightclub scene briefly features the Hi-NRG/Europop song "The Girl You Need" by Tracey.
"Long Road" by Roots Radics is the Reggae track playing on the Yakuza cassette player.

References

External links

 Violent Cop at the Japanese Movie Database
http://www.kitanotakeshi.com/index.php?content=filmography&show_film&id=21

1989 action thriller films
Films about the illegal drug trade
Japanese action thriller films
Japanese neo-noir films
Japanese splatter films
Yakuza films
1989 directorial debut films
Films directed by Takeshi Kitano
Tokyo Metropolitan Police Department in fiction
1980s Japanese films